Daniel Enrique Sarcos Cabrera (born 29 September 1967) is a Venezuelan actor, stand-up comedian, and television personality best known as the host of Súper Sábado Sensacional from 1997–2009 and the Miss Venezuela pageant from 2004–2009. Both of these shows are broadcast on the Venezuelan television channel, Venevisión. From 2011-2018 he also hosted the morning program Un Nuevo Día (formerly named ¡Levántate!) on the Telemundo Television network.

Television career
Sarcos began his television career when he hosted the variety show Frecuencia Latina on Venezolana de Televisión in 1994. In 1996, Sarcos was hired by Venevision to host the Mega Match Sensacional, a new segment on the variety show known as Súper Sábado Sensacional. By the end of the year, then-host Gilberto Correa stepped down from the spot and when the new season began in the January of 1997, Sarcos took over as the show's main host before being replaced by Leonardo Villalobos in 2010. Beginning in 2000, he also started in La Guerra De Los Sexos, another segment from Súper Sábado Sensacional (co-hosting with Viviana Gibelli) until he left in 2009, and was replaced by Winston Vallenilla.  He starred in the Dominican Movie, Un macho de mujer in 2006. Sarcos later hosted El Gran Navegante, which ran from 2007–2008. After his departure from Súper Sábado Sensacional, he hosted El Familión Nestlé: Trato Hecho (Spanish-language version of Deal or No Deal) which airs on Ecuavisa and is sponsored by Nestlé. Following this, he was given the opportunity to host the Miss Ecuador pageant on March 25, 2010. Also, at the start of February 2011, Sarcos became the host of the morning program ¡Levántate!, now known as Un Nuevo Día, which airs on Telemundo.  Sarcos is also the host of Aqui Se Habla Espanol this show airs on Antena Latina, Dominican Republic. On February 23, 2020, Sarcos started hosting La Guerra de los Sexos in the Dominican Republic.

Singing career
Sarcos is also a salsa singer. Two of his songs are featured in the CD Para Innocens, which was released in 1998.

Personal life
From 2003 until 2010, Sarcos was married to his second wife, former Miss Venezuela contestant, model, and television host Chiquinquirá Delgado, with whom he has a daughter.

Filmography

Television
Frecuencia Latina (1994–1995)
Súper Sábado Sensacional (1997-2009)
La Guerra de Los Sexos (2000–2006, 2009)
Anda Pa'l Cará (2003)
El Gran Navegante (2007–2008)
El Familion Nestle: Trato Hecho (2010–2011)
Aqui Se Habla Español (2010–present)
Un Nuevo Día (formerly ¡Levántate!) (2011–2018)
Cobra Kai (Season 5 - 2022, guest appearance)

Stage
Mi Vida No Es Tan Sensacional (2009–present)
¿Divorciarme, Yo? (2011–present)

See also
List of television presenters/Venezuela

References

External links
Official website
Daniel Sarcos on Twitter
Daniel Sarcos on Facebook

Social Media https://www.instagram.com/dsarcos/

Venezuelan television personalities
Salsa musicians
20th-century Venezuelan male singers
People from Maracaibo
1967 births
Living people
Venezuelan expatriates in the Dominican Republic
Naturalized citizens of the Dominican Republic